Love and Suicide may refer to:
 Love and Suicide (2005 film), an American drama film directed by Lisa France
 Love and Suicide (2006 film), an American drama film directed by Mia Salsi